Jack Ellis Young (31 January 1925 in Adelaide, South Australia – 28 August 1987 in Adelaide) was a Motorcycle speedway rider who won the Speedway World Championship in 1951 and 1952. He also won the London Riders' Championship 1953 and 1954 and was a nine time South Australian Champion between 1948 and 1964.

By winning the 1951 and 1952 World Championships, Young became the first Australian to win two World Championships in any form of motorsport.

Career

Australia
Jack Young started racing bikes with younger brother Frank on the Sand Pits at Findon in Adelaide, before starting his speedway career at the Kilburn Speedway on 9 May 1947 riding a 1926 Harley-Davidson Peashooter borrowed from his brother. There he rode alongside older brother Wally "Joey" Young (b. 1916 – d. 1990), and younger brother Frank. Jack and Frank both represented Australia in test matches against England. Quickly proving himself to be one of the best riders in Adelaide, Jack placed an impressive second in the SA title in 1947 (after only having raced at a couple of meetings), and would win his first South Australian Championship in 1948. He would go on to win the SA Championship again in 1954, 1955, 1956, 1958, 1959, 1960, 1963 and 1964, all at Rowley Park Speedway. Young would win the Queensland State Championship in 1953 at the Brisbane Exhibition Ground, and the Victorian State Championship in 1957 at the Tracey's Speedway in Melbourne.

Despite his two World Championships, nine South Australian Championships and the Queensland and Victorian titles, Jack Young would never win or even place in the Australian Individual Speedway Championship, which during his time were held almost exclusively in New South Wales (at the Sydney Showground or Sydney Sports Ground), or in Queensland at the Exhibition Ground. Young declined several invitations to ride in the Australian championship, often preferring to take a break from speedway to enjoy the Australian summer and go fishing. He did finish third in an unofficial "Australian Championship" staged at the Harringay Stadium in London, England in 1950. The promoters of the speedway had a clearing in their schedule and decided fill the space by inviting the top Australian riders in the British Leagues at the time to ride in an Australian Championship (the field included Aussie born New Zealander Ronnie Moore). Brisbane rider Graham Warren won the meeting from NSW rider Aub Lawson and Young.

Jack Young announced his retirement from Speedway in December 1963 on the night he won his ninth and last SA Championship (counted as the 1963/64 Championship). Young and the rider who would succeed him as South Australia's best rider John Boulger, jointly hold the record for SA title wins with nine each.

A lover of fishing, at his home in Adelaide Young was known to use his two World Championship trophies as a place to store his sinkers.

Just a year after his death, Jack Young was inducted into the Sport Australia Hall of Fame for his services to speedway.

In 2008, Young was posthumously inducted into the Australian Speedway Hall of Fame.

In November 2014, Jack Young was inducted into the Motorcycling South Australia Hall of Fame.

International
After winning his first South Australian championship in 1948 at Kilburn, as well as impressive displays for Australia in home Test's against England, Jack Young had the attention of British promoters. He was signed by the Edinburgh Monarchs in 1949 after they paid his fare to come over for a trial. He scored maximum points on his debut, winning all six of his rides.

In 1949, 1950 and 1951, Young won the Scottish Riders Championship (now the Scottish Open) at Old Meadowbank in Edinburgh.

In 1951, Jack Young made history by becoming the first second division rider to become World Champion when he won the title at the Wembley Stadium in London. He defeated England's Split Waterman and fellow Australian Jack Biggs in a three way run-off for the title after each had finished the meeting on 12 points.

In 1952 Young moved up a division by joining the West Ham Hammers for a then record transfer fee of UK£3,750. He also retained his World title in front of 93,000 fans at Wembley, thus becoming the first dual World Champion and the first rider to win the title two years in succession.

He stayed with the Hammers until the end of the 1955 season and is remembered by many West Ham riders and fans alike as the best rider to ever race for the team. Young stayed home in Adelaide for the next two seasons riding mainly at his home track of Rowley Park, but in 1958 he returned to the UK to ride for the Coventry Bees. After again returning home to Adelaide in 1959, he again rode for the Bees in 1960 and 1961.

Jack Young's last World Final appearance was as a reserve rider for the 1961 Championship at the Malmö Stadion in Malmö, Sweden (the first World Championship Final not held at Wembley). Neither Young, nor the other reserve rider, Swede Leif Larsson, got to ride in the final.

Jack Young also represented Australia in test matches both at home and overseas and had the honour of captaining his country on many occasions. He first represented Australia in the 7th test against England on 17 February 1950 at the Kilburn Speedway in Adelaide and proved his class by top scoring on the night with 17 points. During the early part of his career when riding for the Edinburgh Monarchs, Young also represented Scotland in some matches.

Career Highlights
World Champion – 1951, 1952
South Australian Champion – 1948, 1954, 1955, 1956, 1958, 1959, 1960, 1963, 1964
Scottish Riders Champion – 1949, 1950, 1951
Adelaide Golden Helmet winner – 1949 (4 wins at Kilburn Speedway) and 1950 (2 wins at Rowley Park Speedway)
Tom Farndon Memorial Trophy – 1951, 1961
Queensland State Champion – 1953
London Riders' Champion – 1953, 1954
National Trophy (with West Ham Hammers) – 1955
Victorian State Champion – 1957
12 times in succession British Match Race Champion over a two-year period, unbeaten in 33 successive meetings in Britain
Holds the record for the highest points won in a season in Britain.
Inducted into the Sport Australia Hall of Fame – 1988
Inducted into the Australian Speedway Hall of Fame – 2008
Inducted into the Motorcycling South Australia Hall of Fame – 2014

World Final Appearances
 1950 –  London, Wembley Stadium – 8th – 7pts
 1951 –  London, Wembley Stadium – Winner – 12+3pts
 1952 –  London, Wembley Stadium – Winner – 14pts
 1953 –  London, Wembley Stadium – 5th – 10pts
 1954 –  London, Wembley Stadium – 4th – 11pts
 1955 –  London, Wembley Stadium – 7th – 10pts
 1960 –  London, Wembley Stadium – 10th – 6pts
 1961 –  Malmö, Malmö Stadion – Reserve – Did not Ride

Death
Jack died of a lung disorder in Adelaide's Modbury Hospital on 28 August 1987 at the age of sixty two. Years of riding through dust clouds on British cinder tracks, as well as being a heavy cigarette smoker had left Young with Emphysema. He was survived by his wife Joan whom he had married on 12 May 1945 in the All Saints Church of England in the Adelaide suburb of Hindmarsh. Jack and Joan Young (born Joan Mary Carroll) had one son and two daughters.

Jack Young was the idol of a young rider from Christchurch, New Zealand who rode against him in Australia during the early 1960s, with the two forming a friendship that would last until Jack's passing in 1987. That rider, Ivan Mauger, who was actually based at Rowley Park at the time, would go on to win a record six Speedway World Championships (1968, 1969, 1970, 1972, 1977, 1979), three Long Track World Championships (1971, 1972, 1976), four Speedway World Team Cups (1968, 1971, 1972, 1979), and two Speedway World Pairs Championships (1969, 1970). Mauger credits advice he received from Young at the 1960 Australian Long Track Championship in the South Australian coastal town of Port Pirie for putting him on the path to becoming a World Champion.

Jack Young Solo Cup
The Jack Young Solo Cup (formerly known as the Jack Young Memorial Cup) is held in his honour every year at the Gillman Speedway in Adelaide after being previously held from 1990 to 1997 at Gillman's predecessor North Arm Speedway. The first cup was won by Swedish rider Jimmy Nilsen at the conclusion of an Australia vs the Rest of the World test match. The second running of the race again saw a win by a Swedish rider, 1984 and 1988 Ice Racing World Champion Erik Stenlund. The race was again run at the conclusion of Test, this time between Australia and Sweden. The international flavour continued in 1992 when the Cup was won by England's Steve Schofield. The first Australian winner was Mildura rider Jason Lyons who won the Cup in 1993.

Ten times Australian Solo Champion Leigh Adams from Mildura holds the record with five wins in 1994 and 1997 (North Arm), and 2001, 2002 and 2003 (Gillman). The first South Australian rider to win the cup was Shane Bowes who won in 1996.

1995 winner Tomasz Gollob from Poland (who was based at North Arm for the 1994/95 Australian season) is the only rider to win the cup who has emulated Young's feat of winning the Individual Speedway World Championship. Gollob won the 2010 Speedway Grand Prix series to become the World Champion, while Leigh Adams was the 1992 World Under-21 Champion and Eric Stenlund was a dual Ice Racing World Champion.

With the closure of North Arm in 1997, and the new Gillman Speedway not ready for championship meetings until 2001, the Jack Young Solo Cup was not held from 1998 to 2000. Leigh Adams won the Cup the last time it was held at North Arm in 1997 as well as the first time it was run at Gillman in 2001. The 2001 meeting, held on 26 January (Australia Day), was also the official opening of the new Gillman Speedway.

After being a single, six lap race for many years, the Jack Young Solo Cup is currently run in a championship format with riders earning points in the heats before the top scorers go into a semi final and then the final. The current holder of the Jack Young Solo Cup is Tyron Proctor who won his third JYSC in four years on 28 November 2015.

* Note: The winner of the "Scottish Open Championship", of which Young was a three time winner, also receives the "Jack Young Memorial Scottish Open Trophy" in honour of the former Edinburgh Monarchs star rider. Adelaide's Rory Schlein is the only rider to have won both Jack Young Memorial trophies.

Jack Young Solo Cup Winners

References

External links
Jack Young Bio

1925 births
1987 deaths
Australian speedway riders
Individual Speedway World Champions
Edinburgh Monarchs riders
West Ham Hammers riders
Coventry Bees riders
Sport Australia Hall of Fame inductees
Sportspeople from Adelaide
Sportsmen from South Australia